Brentwood Union Free School District is a school district headquartered in Brentwood, New York.

In 2015 Joseph C. Bond, previously superintendent of Brentwood UFSD, became the interim superintendent of Bay Shore School District. In 2017 Richard Loeschner became superintendent of the district.

Schools
 High schools
 Brentwood High School
 Brentwood Freshman Center
 Middle schools
 East Middle School
 North Middle School
 South Middle School
 West Middle School
 Elementary schools
 Frank J. Cannon Southeast Elementary School
 East Elementary School
 Hemlock Park Elementary School
 Gail Elaine Kirkham Northeast Elementary School
 Laurel Park Elementary School
 Loretta Park Elementary School
 North Elementary School
 Oak Park Elementary School
 Pine Park Elementary School
 Southwest Elementary School
 Twin Pines Elementary School

References

External links
Brentwood Union Free School District

School districts in New York (state)
Education in Suffolk County, New York